Yellow-legged frog may refer to:

 Foothill yellow-legged frog (Rana boylii), a frog in the family Ranidae found from northern Oregon, down California's west coast and into Baja California
 Mountain yellow-legged frog, (Rana muscosa), a frog in the family Ranidae endemic the mountain ranges of Southern California up to the southern Sierra Nevada in California, United States
 Sierra Nevada yellow-legged frog ((Rana sierrae), a frog in the family Ranidae endemic to the Sierra Nevada mountains in California and Nevada in the United States